

Hans Wilhelm Auer (26 April 1847 – 30 August 1906) was a Swiss-Austrian architect best known for his design of the Swiss Bundeshaus (1894–1902) in Bern.

Auer was born in Wädenswil. A pupil first of Gottfried Semper at the ETH Zurich and then staff assistant for Theophil Hansen in Vienna, Auer established his own office in 1887 and enjoyed a rich and varied career as a practicing architect, educator, and theorist. He died at Konstanz.

Like his near-contemporary Constantin Lipsius, Auer was an eloquent advocate for architectural realism, a sophisticated theoretical stance that became increasingly significant in the 1880s on the continent. Architectural Realists sought to renew contemporary architecture through thoughtful reconsideration of the symbolic properties of the classical language of architectural expression; this "realistic" reconsideration required a new level of archaeological accuracy in the understanding of the emergence and evolution of specific forms. Auer's brilliant historical discussion of the triglyph (1880) comprised the basis for his own reflections on improving the existing state of contemporary architecture. Architectural realism enabled Auer's generation to disengage from slavish imitation of historical forms and hastened the emergence of more subtle perspectives on stylistic innovation. Auer's unique contribution as an architectural theorist was to expand the notion of architectural space as a significant aspect of style and evolution (1883), an accomplishment that is usually consigned to the art historian August Schmarsow (1893).

What we now regard as "high modernist" architectural theory was achieved by the next generation (largely born during the final quarter of the 19th century), although many of its conceptual foundations were grasped by the Architectural Realists of the 1880s.

References

English 
 Berry, J. Duncan. "Hans Auer and the Morality of Architectural Space", in: Deborah J. Johnson and David Ogawa (eds.) Seeing and Beyond. A Essays on Eighteenth- to Twenty-First-Century Art in Honor of Kermit S. Champa (Berlin/New York, 2005), pp. 149–184. 
 Mallgrave, Harry F. Gottfried Semper. Architect of the Nineteenth Century (New Haven, 1996). 
 Mallgrave, Harry F. Modern Architectural Theory: A Historical Survey, 1673–1968 (Cambridge, 2005). 
 Schwarzer, Mitchell. German Architectural Theory and the Search for Modern Identity (Cambridge, 1995), pp. 80–81, 192-94.

German 

 Architektonische Rundschau V (1889): pl. 80 + plans.
 Auer, Hans Wilhelm. “Die Bedeutung der Triglyphen. Ein Beitrag zur Frage über den Zusammenhang ægyptischer mit dorischer Baukunst,” Zeitschrift für bildenden Künste 15 (1880): 279-283, 322-325, 354-360.
 Auer, Franz (sic).“Der Einfluß der Construction auf die Entwicklung der Baustyle,” Zeitschrift des österreichischen Ingenieur- und Architektenvereins 33, no. 1 (1881), 8-18.
 Auer, Hans Wilhelm. “Die Entwickelung des Raumes in der Baukunst,” Allgemeine Bauzeitung 48 (1883), 65-68, 73-74 + pls. 51-52.
 Auer, Hans Wilhelm. “Moderne Stylfragen,” Allgemeine Bauzeitung 50 (1885): 19-21, 25-27.
 Auer, Hans Wilhelm. “Die Quaderbossierung der italienischen Renaissance,” Zeitschrift des österreichischen Ingenieur- und Architekten-Vereins 39 (1887), 179-186 + Pls. XXXIII-XXXV.

 Auer, Hans Wilhelm. “Börsengebäude” in: Joseph Durm et al. (eds.), Handbuch der Architektur, IV. Theil, 2. Halbband, 2. Heft: Gebäude für die Zwecke des Wohnens, des Handels und Verkehrs (Stuttgart, 1902), 247-302.
 Birkner, Othmar. “Hans Wilhelm Auer,” Sauer Allgemeines Künstler-Lexikon. Die Bildenden Künstler aller Zeiten und Völker (Munich/Leipzig, 1992), V: 612.
 Brun, Carl. "Hans Auer," in: idem., Schweizerisches Künstler-Lexikon (Frauenfeld, 1905) I: 61f.
 Dehio, Wien: II. bis IX. und XX. Bezirk (Vienna, 1993), p. 274. 
 Innerhofer, Franz. "Hans Wilhelm Auer," in: Ulrich Thieme and Felix Becker (eds.), Allgemeines Lexikon der bildenden Künstler von der Antike bis zur Gegenwart (Leipzig, 1908) II: 243.
 Kisa, A. “Die Bauten Hans Auer's,” Allgemeine Kunst-Chronik 11, no. 19 (1887), pp. 493–494.
 Lucae, Richard. “Über die Macht des Raumes in der Baukunst,“ Zeitschrift für Bauwesen 19 (1869), pp. 294–306.
 Müller, Andreas. Der verbitterte Bundeshausarchitekt. Die vertrackte Geschichte des Parlamentsgebäudes und seines Erbauers Hans Wilhelm Auer, 1847-1906 (Zurich, 2002). 
 Schmarsow, August. Das Wesen der architektonischen Schöpfung (Leipzig, 1894).
 Schnaase, Karl. Niederländische Briefe (Stuttgart/Tübingen, 1834).

1847 births
1906 deaths
People from Wädenswil
19th-century Austrian people
19th-century Swiss people
Austrian architects
Swiss architects
Austrian people of Swiss descent